Samir Ćeremida (born 6 November 1964) is a Bosnian guitarist, a member of Bosnian pop rock band Plavi orkestar. His twin brother Admir is a drummer in the same band. Formerly, he was a member of a Bosnian garage rock band Zabranjeno Pušenje.

Career 
Ćeremida was born in Sarajevo, then capital of the SR Bosnia and Herzegovina to Mahmut Ćeremida (1925-2004) and Jasminka Ćeremida. His father was a local lawyer, a World War 2 veteran, and a pious Sunni Muslim who attended the Hajj earning the title of "Hajji" (Bosnian: Hadžija) upon returning home.

At the age of six, Ćeremida started playing the guitar. In the early 1980s, he performed with several local bands, such as Linija života, Posljednji autobus, and Elvis J. Kurtović & His Meteors. After that, he got an offer to play for Zabranjeno Pušenje and stayed there for a year. In January 1983, they played at the Faculty of Philosophy in Sarajevo together with Plavi orkestar and the Elvis J. Kurtović & His Meteors. Three months before the compulsory military service, he left Zabranjeno Pušenje and joined Plavi orkestar. He served his military service in Niš, SR Serbia. Upon completing his stint in the military, he studied at the Faculty of Veterinary Medicine in Sarajevo, ceasing his studies after two years. His twin brother, Admir, who is a drummer in the Plavi Orkestar, is a licensed physician.

With the Plavi orkestar, Ćeremida has performed on all band's studio albums, including Soldatski bal (1985), Smrt fašizmu (1986), Sunce na prozoru (1989), Simpatija (1991), Long Play (1998), Infinity (1999), and Sedam (2012).

In 1996, Ćeremida accompanied Sejo Sexon and Elvis J. Kurtović, with whom he restarted band Zabranjeno Pušenje, disbanded in the early 1990s. He performed on their fifth studio album, Fildžan viška, which was released in 1997.

Ćeremida and his twin brother Admir operate a bar named Havana in the Sarajevo's historical downtown, Baščaršija.

Discography 
Plavi orkestar
 Soldatski bal (1985)
 Smrt fašizmu (1986)
 Sunce na prozoru (1989)
 Simpatija (1991)
 Long Play (1998)
 Infinity (1999)
 Sedam (2012)

Zabranjeno pušenje
 Fildžan viška (1997)

Overdream 
 Overdream (1996)

Notes

References

External links
 Samir Ćeremida on Discogs

1964 births
Living people
Bosnia and Herzegovina guitarists
Bosnia and Herzegovina male guitarists
Musicians from Sarajevo
Zabranjeno pušenje members
Bosnia and Herzegovina musicians